Zvánovice is a municipality and village in Prague-East District in the Central Bohemian Region of the Czech Republic. It has about 600 inhabitants.

History
The first written mention of Zvánovice is from 1320.

References

External links

Villages in Prague-East District